Alexandrovsk is a closed administrative-territorial formation in Murmansk Oblast, Russia. Its administrative center is the town of Polyarny. Population:

History
It was formed on May 28, 2008, when Russian President Dmitry Medvedev signed a presidential decree merging the closed-administrative formations of Polyarny, Skalisty, and Snezhnogorsk into one in order to improve efficiency.

Administrative and municipal status
Within the framework of administrative divisions, its status is equal to that of the districts. As a municipal division, it is incorporated as Alexandrovsk Urban Okrug.

Apart from the three towns, the formation includes five rural localities.

References

Notes

Sources

Geography of Murmansk Oblast
Closed cities